Mahuaa Khobor was a 24-hour Bengali news channel launched in 2010.  The news channel covered local news of West Bengal as well as other national and International News.

See also
International broadcasting
List of Indian television stations
24-hour television news channels

References

External links

Television channels and stations established in 2010
Television stations in Kolkata
2010 establishments in West Bengal